Amaxia bella is a moth of the family Erebidae. It was described by William Schaus in 1905. It is found in French Guiana and Suriname.

References

Moths described in 1905
Amaxia
Moths of South America